Stepstone Creek is a stream located entirely within Pendleton County, Kentucky.

Stepstone Creek was named for the natural "steps" within its course.

See also
List of rivers of Kentucky

References

Rivers of Pendleton County, Kentucky
Rivers of Kentucky